Rob Smith (born 29 September 1982) is an Irish singer-songwriter, DJ and writer from Terenure, Dublin.

Biography
Smith released his debut album, Throwing It All Away, in March 2008 to considerable success and toured in 10 countries across Europe promoting it. The lead single from the album, Stand Up, reached number 1 in the Irish downloads charts that summer. The follow up, 2010's The Juliana Field, was released to critical acclaim and landed Smith a nomination for Most Promising Act at that year's Meteor Awards. He released a live EP, titled Live in New York & Dublin, the following year. He released a well-received punk rock single in February 2015 called Dale Boca Juniors which charted in both Ireland and Argentina. In May 2015, he released a compilation titled Snapped Strings & Hangovers.

He is also a DJ, specialising in indie and alternative rock, and has spun in countries such as Italy, Netherlands, Scotland and the United States. A notable Boca Juniors fan, he is also a football writer for Irish music magazine Hot Press.

The Swedish Railway Orchestra
The Swedish Railway Orchestra is an electronic project by Smith; he released his debut LP Northern Lights under the name in September 2016, as well the follow up This Is a Dream to critical acclaim. Musically, the project has been described in the press as a cross between LCD Soundsystem and Jape.

Discography

Albums
Throwing It All Away – 15 March 2008
The Juliana Field – 20 August 2010
Northern Lights – 1 September 2016 (as The Swedish Railway Orchestra)
This Is a Dream – 29 September 2017 (as The Swedish Railway Orchestra)
This Is a Mixtape – 1 May 2019 (as The Swedish Railway Orchestra)
The Swedish Railway Orchestra – 29 July 2020 (as The Swedish Railway Orchestra)

Extended plays
Live in New York & Dublin – 2011
Late Night (as The Swedish Railway Orchestra) – 31 October 2016
Remixes, Vol. 1 (as The Swedish Railway Orchestra) – 26 October 2018

Compilations
Snapped Strings & Hangovers – 29 May 2015

Singles
"So Many, So Near" – 2008
"Stand Up" – 2008
"Rue Sainte-Dominique" – 2011
"Dale Boca Juniors" – 2015
"Bostero" – 2016
"Northern Lights" – 2016 (as The Swedish Railway Orchestra)
"Water" – 2016 (as The Swedish Railway Orchestra)
"The Allegiance of Bobby Turbulence" – 2016 (as The Swedish Railway Orchestra)
"I Don't See Any Daylight Anymore" – 2017 (as The Swedish Railway Orchestra)
"Time" – 2017 (as The Swedish Railway Orchestra)
"Why Don't You Talk to Me" – 2017 (as The Swedish Railway Orchestra)
"All I Want" – 2017 (as The Swedish Railway Orchestra)
"This Is a Dream" – 2017 (as The Swedish Railway Orchestra)
"Bullet for a Bullfighter / I Love You (But If You Clap When the Plane Lands, I'll Leave You!)" – 2017 (as The Swedish Railway Orchestra)
"Wy Bk Hm" – 2019 (as The Swedish Railway Orchestra)
"Cold Condensation" – 2019 (as The Swedish Railway Orchestra)
"Hell's Kitchen" – 2019 (as The Swedish Railway Orchestra)
"The House of Blood" – 2020 (as The Swedish Railway Orchestra)
"The Freaks Come Out at Night" – 2020 (as The Swedish Railway Orchestra)
"What's Going On" – 2020 (as The Swedish Railway Orchestra)
"Brendan Gleeson" – 2020 (as The Swedish Railway Orchestra)
"Der Neonroom" – 2020 (as The Swedish Railway Orchestra)
"There's Too Much Love" – 2020 (as The Swedish Railway Orchestra)

References

External links
Official website
Facebook page
Twitter account
Hot Press online column

Irish  male singer-songwriters
Musicians from Dublin (city)
Living people
1982 births
21st-century Irish  male singers